Sian-e Sofla (also Romanized as Sīān-e Soflá, Seyān Soflá,  and Siyan Sofla; also known as Sīān-e Pā’īn and Siān Pāīn) is a village in Hamzehlu Rural District, in the Central District of Khomeyn County, Markazi Province, Iran. At the 2006 census, its population was 422, in 117 families.

References 

Populated places in Khomeyn County